Alan Di Fiore (sometimes Alan DiFiore) is a Canadian screenwriter and producer of film and television, best known for his work on Grimm and the thriller film  Money Monster, starring George Clooney, Julia Roberts and Jack O'Connell.

Early life
DiFiore co-founded Pagliacci's Restaurant, located in Victoria, British Columbia, Canada, with his friend, Howard Siegel. His mother was the creator of most of Pagliacci's Restaurant's outstanding menu items.

Career 

DiFiore has worked extensively across film and television since the early 1990s.  His numerous television credits include the CTV movie The Life and Milgaard, which won eight Geminis; the mini-series Vendetta and episodes of Ghost Whisperer and Neon Rider. In 2005, he won his third Gemini Award for his work on the Da Vinci's Inquest television show. DiFiore also wrote and served as producer on the CBS series The Handler.

In 2010, Di Fiore created The Bridge. The series was inspired by former Toronto police union head, Craig Bromell. It's a procedural drama about a union leader fighting criminals on the street, his bosses, and corruption on the force. Di Foire executive produced it alongside Laszlo Barna, Bromell, Robert Wertheimer and Adam J. Shully. He also worked on the fantasy police procedural drama television series Grimm (co-created by Jim Kouf, whom Di Fiore has worked with on several projects) as a writer and producer.

In 2016, Money Monster was released, directed by Jodie Foster. Di Fiore and Kouf wrote the original script of the film. On July 25, 2014, TriStar Pictures won the rights to finance and release the film, whose latest draft was written by Jamie Linden.

Filmography

References

External links

Living people
Canadian male television actors
Canadian people of Italian descent
Canadian television writers
Canadian television producers
Film producers from British Columbia
Canadian male screenwriters
Canadian male television writers
21st-century Canadian male writers
Year of birth missing (living people)
21st-century Canadian screenwriters